Walden is an unincorporated community in Lane County, Oregon, United States.

Walden was a station on the Oregon and Southeastern Railroad (now converted to the Row River Trail). According to state representative and local lumber company owner L. L. "Stub" Stewart, the station was named for a family of early residents in the area. There is a Nathan B. Walden listed in the 1880 Census for the Cottage Grove Precinct. The 1973 film Emperor of the North was shot in the Walden area along the rail line.

The Brumbaugh covered bridge, a National Register of Historic Places property, once stood near Walden, spanning Mosby Creek. It was dismantled and the wood used in the Centennial Covered Bridge in Cottage Grove. The Stewart and Mosby Creek bridges still stand in the Walden area, as well as the historic Walden Store & Gas Station building, built circa 1900. The store closed in about 2002.

Notable people
Opal Whiteley and her grandparents lived in Walden; Opal mentioned the area in her book The Diary of Opal Whiteley.

References

External links
Historic images of Walden from Salem Public Library
Image of the Walden School from  Center for Electronic Studying, University of Oregon
Images of Walden from Flickr

Unincorporated communities in Lane County, Oregon
Unincorporated communities in Oregon